Peziza halophila (now Daleomyces halophilus) is an ascomycete fungus in the family Pezizaceae, described as new to science in 2017. It was originally described in genus Peziza by Crous and colleagues in 2017, but in 2020 was transferred to the genus Deleomyces by Van Vooren, based on molecular data.

It is found on coastal dunes and halophytic wetlands on the Mediterranean island of Cyprus.

References

External links 
 On Species Fungorum

 On Ascomycete.org

Pezizaceae
Fungi described in 2017